is a passenger railway station located in the city of Koshigaya, Saitama, Japan, operated by East Japan Railway Company (JR East).

Lines

Station layout
The elevated station has two opposed side platforms serving two tracks, with the station building located underneath. The station is staffed.

Platforms

History
The station opened on 15 March 2008.

Passenger statistics
In fiscal 2019, the station was used by an average of 28,675 passengers daily (boarding passengers only).

Surrounding area
 Aeon Laketown shopping mall

Schools
 Koshigaya-Minami Senior High School
 Eimei Senior High School
 Minami Junior High School
 Koyo Junior High School
 Kawayanagi Elementary School
 Meisei Elementary School

See also
 List of railway stations in Japan

References

External links

 Koshigaya-Laketown Station information (JR East) 
 Koshigaya-Laketown Station information (Saitama Prefectural Government) 

Stations of East Japan Railway Company
Railway stations in Saitama Prefecture
Railway stations in Japan opened in 2008
Musashino Line
Koshigaya, Saitama